Joe Harrison may refer to:
 Joe Harrison (athlete) (born 1954), Canadian Paralympic athlete
 Joe Harrison (footballer, born January 1903) (1903–1977), Australian rules footballer for Essendon
 Joe Harrison (politician) (born 1952), member of the Louisiana House of Representatives
 Joe H. Harrison (1903–1960), Australian rules footballer for Richmond

See also 
 Joseph Harrison (disambiguation)